Valery Rezantsev (born 8 October 1946) is a Russian Greco-Roman wrestler. He was an Olympic gold medalist in 1972 and in 1976, competing for the Soviet Union. He won gold medals at the 1970, 1971, 1973, 1974, and 1975 World Wrestling Championships.

References

External links

1946 births
Living people
Soviet male sport wrestlers
Russian male sport wrestlers
Olympic wrestlers of the Soviet Union
Wrestlers at the 1972 Summer Olympics
Wrestlers at the 1976 Summer Olympics
Olympic gold medalists for the Soviet Union
Olympic medalists in wrestling
Medalists at the 1976 Summer Olympics
Medalists at the 1972 Summer Olympics
World Wrestling Championships medalists
European Wrestling Championships medalists